Ismael Pochong Abubakar Jr (April 17, 1949 - June 6, 2017) was a Filipino politician who served as the first speaker of the Regional Legislative Assembly of the Autonomous Region in Muslim Mindanao. In 1988 he served as the Vice Governor of Tawi-Tawi, and in 1990 was elected to the ARMM Regional Legislative Assembly, where he served as its first speaker. Ismael Pochong Abubakar Jr died in June 2017.

Career
Abubakar was selected to serve as the Vice Governor of the Tawi-Tawi province in 1989, despite being a member of the opposition party. In 1990, he was elected to a seat in the ARMM Regional Legislative Assembly, and became that body's first speaker. In May 2003 Abubakar was elected as speaker of the Regional Legislative Assembly, but was prevented by a court order from exercising the functions of that office because Ibrahim Ibay also claimed that position, and the two had effectively been acting as speaker at the same time. In August 2003 he was again elected speaker of the Regional Legislative Assembly, making him its third speaker in 14 months. In 2009, he was included in The 500 Most Influential Muslims list. His description on the list stated, “Abubakar is the former speaker of the Autonomous Region in Muslim Mindanao's regional
legislative assembly. He is now concentrating on business and interfaith dialogue, convening the
Philippine Council for Islam and Democracy. He is from the predominantly Muslim Sama tribe,
which garners him a significant amount of respect in dealing with the Muslim militants.”

References

Filipino Muslims
20th-century Filipino politicians
21st-century Filipino politicians
2017 deaths
1949 births